Sorolopha herbifera is a moth of the family Tortricidae. It is found in Vietnam, India, Sri Lanka, Sumatra, Java and Taiwan.

Adults have a light bluish-grey ground colour, partially marbled with white and with dark green, well-defined markings.

The larvae feed on Cinnamomum camphora.

References

Moths described in 1909
Olethreutini
Moths of Asia